This is a list of seasons completed by the Iowa State Cyclones football program since the team's conception in 1892. The list documents season-by-season records, and conference records from 1908 to the present.

Seasons

 The AP Poll was introduced in 1936. Thus, there are no polls for previous seasons.
 The Coaches Poll was introduced in 1950. Therefore, polls for prior seasons do not exist.
 The MVIAA did not have any standings or award a champion during the 1918 football season due to World War I and the outbreak of the Spanish Flu.
 The Big 6, Big 7, and Big 8 were the same conference. The name was unofficially changed when the membership changed.
 Overtime rules in were introduced in 1996, making ties impossible.
 Iowa State tied Colorado for first in the division, but Colorado won the tiebreaker by virtue of its head-to-head win.

References

Iowa State Cyclones

Iowa State Cyclones football seasons